Wolf Crossing may refer to one of the following places in the United States:

 Wolf Crossing, Michigan
 Wolf Crossing, Arizona